Trevon Coley (born July 13, 1994) is an American football defensive end who is a free agent. He played college football at Florida Atlantic. He has previously played for the Washington Redskins, Indianapolis Colts, Cleveland Browns, Baltimore Ravens, and New York Jets.

Early years
Coley played high school football for the Patriots at Miramar High School in Miramar, Florida. He was named Second Team All-State for his senior season in 2011.

College career
Coley played for the Florida Atlantic Owls of Florida Atlantic University from 2012 to 2015. He was named First Team All-Conference USA in 2015. He was also team captain and the team's MVP in 2015. Coley played in 48 games, all starts, during his college career. He was a communication major at Florida Atlantic. He played in the 2016 East–West Shrine Game.

Professional career
Coley was rated the 33rd best defensive tackle in the 2016 NFL Draft by NFLDraftScout.com. Lance Zierlein of NFL.com predicted that he would go undrafted, stating "While he's got decent play strength, solid hand usage and the desired motor, his smallish stature will be tough to overlook for teams during the draft. With that said, he's a good football player and will get his shot in a camp."

Baltimore Ravens
After going undrafted, Coley signed with the Baltimore Ravens on May 6, 2016. He was waived by the Ravens on August 29, 2016.

Washington Redskins
On November 30, 2016, Coley was signed to the Washington Redskins' practice squad. He was released by the Redskins on December 13, 2016.

Cleveland Browns
On December 15, 2016, Coley was signed to the Cleveland Browns' practice squad. He signed a reserve/future contract with the Browns on January 2, 2017. In Week 2 of the 2017 season, against the Baltimore Ravens, Coley recovered a fumble from Ravens' running back Alex Collins in the 24–10 loss. On the same play, Coley then fumbled the ball himself and it was recovered by teammate Nate Orchard. Overall, he played in 15 games in the 2017 season. He recorded 41 combined tackles, two sacks, four quarterback hits, and two passes defensed. In the 2018 season, he appeared in all 16 games and started 14 for the Browns. He recorded a safety in Week 7 against the Tampa Bay Buccaneers when he tackled Peyton Barber in the endzone in the first quarter. He finished the season with 0.5 sacks, 39 combined tackles, one quarterback hit, and one fumble recovery.

Coley was waived by the Browns on September 1, 2019.

Baltimore Ravens (second stint)
On September 3, 2019, Coley was signed to the Baltimore Ravens practice squad.

Indianapolis Colts 
On October 1, 2019, Coley was signed by the Indianapolis Colts off the Ravens practice squad.

Arizona Cardinals
On March 27, 2020, Coley signed with the Arizona Cardinals. On September 5, 2020, Coley was waived during final roster cuts. He was re-signed to the practice squad a day later. He was elevated to the active roster on October 19 and 24 for the team's weeks 6 and 7 games against the Dallas Cowboys, and reverted to the practice squad after each game. He was signed to the active roster on November 14. He was waived on December 12, 2020.

New York Jets
On December 14, 2020, Coley was claimed off waivers by the New York Jets.

Tennessee Titans
On June 3, 2021, Coley signed with the Tennessee Titans. He was placed on injured reserve on August 17, 2021.

Chicago Bears
On August 5, 2022, Coley signed with the Chicago Bears. He was released on August 30, 2022 and signed to the practice squad the next day.

Personal life
Coley is the cousin of former NFL quarterback Rohan Davey.

References

External links
Cleveland Browns bio
FAU Owls bio
College statistics

Living people
1994 births
African-American players of American football
People from Miramar, Florida
Players of American football from Florida
Sportspeople from Miami-Dade County, Florida
American football defensive tackles
Florida Atlantic Owls football players
Baltimore Ravens players
Washington Redskins players
Cleveland Browns players
Indianapolis Colts players
Arizona Cardinals players
New York Jets players
Tennessee Titans players
Chicago Bears players
21st-century African-American sportspeople
Sportspeople from Broward County, Florida
Miramar High School alumni